Scelotes duttoni is a species of lizard in the family Scincidae. The species is endemic to the Bazaruto Archipelago in Mozambique.

Etymology
The specific name, duttoni, is in honor of South African ecologist Paul Dutton.

Habitat

Description
S. duttoni has no front legs, only vestigial buds. Each back leg has only two digits, the inner digit much longer than the outer. The tail length is slightly shorter than (SVL). Dorsally, S. duttoni is blackish, with a pale dorsolateral line on each side.

Reproduction
S. duttoni is ovoviviparous. Litter size is two or three young. Each newborn measures  in total length (including tail).

References

Further reading
Broadley DG (1990). "The herpetofaunas of the islands off the coast of South Moçambique". Arnoldia (Zimbabwe) 9 (35): 469–493. (Scelotes duttoni, new species).
Broadley DG (1994). "The genus Scelotes Fitzinger (Reptilia: Scincidae) in Mozambique, Swaziland and Natal, South Africa". Annals of the Natal Museum 35: 237–259.

duttoni
Reptiles of Mozambique
Endemic fauna of Mozambique
Reptiles described in 1990
Taxa named by Donald George Broadley